Vedic Kanya College is a girls college in Jaipur city in Rajasthan state in India. It is situated in Raja Park locality of Jaipur. The college offers undergraduate courses. It was established in 1990. The college is affiliated to University of Rajasthan.

References
India today

Women's universities and colleges in Jaipur
Educational institutions established in 1990
1990 establishments in Rajasthan